The Towne–Williams House on 7th St., N., in Bismarck, North Dakota was built in 1885.  It has also been known as the George W. Wallace House and as the Erastus A. Williams House.  It was listed on the National Register of Historic Places (NRHP) in 1975.

Its NRHP nomination argued that it "is the most unaltered survivor of a handful of large, mansion-size residences built on the near north side of Bismarck soon after the city became the capital of Dakota Territory in 1882."

References

Houses on the National Register of Historic Places in North Dakota
Victorian architecture in North Dakota
Houses completed in 1885
Houses in Bismarck, North Dakota
National Register of Historic Places in Bismarck, North Dakota